Got to Believe started its second season storyline half-way of its 108th episode that was aired in the Philippines on January 22, 2014 with the title, "The New Chapter". Same with season 1, each episode titles that appear at the intertitle were being used as official hashtags for the micro-blogging site Twitter.
 
Season 2 had some of its scenes filmed in Singapore and this was also weaved into the narrative of the series. Chichay, Joaquin, Alex and Juliana were seen around the country's famous places such as Merlion Park, The Helix Bridge, Marina Barrage, Gardens by the Bay, Haji Lane and Singapore Botanic Gardens.

Being the final season, the television series concluded on March 7, 2014 with the title "Best Ending Ever".

Series overview and Ratings 

{| class="wikitable plainrowheaders" style="text-align: center;"
|- class="wikitable" style="text-align: center;"
! style="padding: 0 8px;" colspan="2"| Month
! style="padding: 0 8px;" | Episodes
! style="padding: 0 8px;" | Peak
! style="padding: 0 8px;" | Average Rating
! style="padding: 0 8px;" | Rank
! style="padding: 0 8px;" | Source
|-
|style="padding: 0 8px; background:#ce5491;"| 
| ' style="padding: 0 8px;" |January 2014
|  style="padding: 0 8px;"|8
|  style="padding: 0 8px;"|33.4% (Episode 114)
|  style="padding: 0 8px;"|25.5%
|  style="padding: 0 8px;"|#5
|  style="padding: 0 8px;"|ABS-CBN OPENS 2014 ON TOP
|-
|style="padding: 0 8px; background:#d462ff;"| 
| ' style="padding: 0 8px;" |February 2014
|  style="padding: 0 8px;"|20
|  style="padding: 0 8px;"|33.1% (Episodes 131 and 132)
|  style="padding: 0 8px;"|29.9%
|  style="padding: 0 8px;"|#3
|  style="padding: 0 8px;"|
|-
|style="padding: 0 8px; background:#128a50;"| 
| ' style="padding: 0 8px;" |March 2014
|  style="padding: 0 8px;"|5
|  style="padding: 0 8px;"|38.6% (Episode 140)
|  style="padding: 0 8px;"|34.6%
|  style="padding: 0 8px;"|#1
|  style="padding: 0 8px;"|
|}

Episodes

January 2014

February 2014

March 2014

References 

2014 Philippine television seasons